A mess is a place where military personnel socialise, eat and, in some cases, live.

Mess may also refer to:

Places
 Mess (river), Luxembourg
 Mess Creek, British Columbia
 Mess Lake, British Columbia, Canada

MESS
 MESS (festival), an annual theatre festival in Sarajevo, Bosnia and Herzegovina
 Mount Elizabeth Secondary School, Kitimat, British Columbia, Canada
 Multi Emulator Super System, an emulator for computer systems
 Melbourne Electronic Sound Studio, a non-profit organization

Music
 Mess (band), an Austrian musical group
 The Mess, a French girl band (2013-2014)
 Mess (Fila Brazillia album)
 Mess (Liars album)
 Mess (The Hard Aches album)
 "Mess", a song by Ben Folds Five from the 1999 album The Unauthorized Biography of Reinhold Messner 
 "Mess", a song by Real Friends from the 2016 album The Home Inside My Head
 "Mess", a song by Lil Wayne from the 2018 album Tha Carter V
 "The Mess", a song by Paul McCartney and Wings as a B-side to "My Love"

Other uses
 Mark Messier (born 1961), nicknamed "Mess", Canadian retired National Hockey League player
 Mess Búachalla, the mother of the High King Conaire Mór in Irish mythology
 Mess hall
 Mess kit
 Mess management specialist
 Mess of pottage

See also
 Messe (disambiguation)